The Gilman Paper Company collection is an archive of original photographic prints and negatives, and it was donated to the Metropolitan Museum of Art. The collection was formed over the course of two decades (roughly 1977–1997) by Howard Gilman (1924–1998), chairman of the Gilman Paper Company.

Publication 

A bound folio of the collection was published as Photographs from the Collection of the Gilman Paper Company  by The White Oak Press, 1985. The edition was limited to 1200 copies. The images were curated by Pierre Apraxine and the plates were made by master printer and photographer Richard Benson.

The curated images in Photographs from the Collection of the Gilman Paper Company consist of iconic images from the era of daguerreotypes to 1960's images by Robert Frank and Diane Arbus.

Richard Benson's print work for the publication is described as  "the magisterial Photographs from the Collection of the Gilman Paper Company (1985), are the apex of black-and-white, offset lithography presswork."

References

External links
Gilman Collection to Met

Photographic collections and books
Photo archives